Gonzalo Taboada (5 November 1928 – 2 February 2017) was a Spanish bobsledder. He competed in the four-man event at the 1956 Winter Olympics.

References

1928 births
2017 deaths
Spanish male bobsledders
Olympic bobsledders of Spain
Bobsledders at the 1956 Winter Olympics
Sportspeople from Madrid